Michael Lusch (born 16 June 1964) is a German football coach and a retired player.

Honours
Borussia Dortmund
 UEFA Cup finalist: 1992–93
 DFB-Pokal: 1988–89

References

External links
 

1964 births
Living people
Sportspeople from Hamm
Footballers from North Rhine-Westphalia
Association football midfielders
German footballers
Germany under-21 international footballers
Borussia Dortmund players
Borussia Dortmund II players
1. FC Kaiserslautern players
KFC Uerdingen 05 players
Rot-Weiss Essen players
Bundesliga players
West German footballers